¡Ciaütistico! is the debut album from XXL, the collaborative effort of Italian experimental rock band Larsen and American band Xiu Xiu. It was recorded at Larsen's studio in Turin, Italy. Though largely instrumental, the album features vocals from Caralee McElroy on "Paw Paw Paw Paw Paw Paw Paw" and "Minne Mouseistic" and Jamie Stewart on "(Pokey I'm Your) Gnocchi" and "Prince Charming", a cover of the 1981 single by Adam and the Ants.

Track listing

References

External links
 Ciautistico! at Important Records.

2005 debut albums
Xiu Xiu albums
Collaborative albums
Important Records albums